The 1995–96 Iraqi Advanced Clubs League was the 22nd season of the competition since its foundation in 1974. The name of the league was changed from Iraqi National Clubs First Division to Iraqi Advanced Clubs League. The league title was won by Al-Zawraa for the third consecutive time. They also won the Iraq FA Cup for the fourth consecutive time, meaning they won three doubles in a row. In this season, a win was worth three points and the bonus point system from the previous season was removed.

League table

Results

Season statistics

Top scorers

Hat-tricks

References

External links
 Iraq Football Association

Iraqi Premier League seasons
1995–96 in Iraqi football
Iraq